Hugo Richard Meyer (April 1, 1866 – 1923) was an American author and economist concerned with public ownership of telegraph, phone, railway and other utilities.

Biography
Meyer graduated from Harvard College in 1892, and attended the Harvard Graduate School in 1892-96 where he received an A.M. in 1894. He was instructor in political economy at Harvard in 1897-1903, and was assistant professor in that subject at the University of Chicago in 1904-05. After 1907, he resided in Melbourne where he was writing a history of state ownership in Victoria, Australia.

Works
Government Regulation of Railroad Rates (1905)
Municipal Ownership in Great Britain (1906)

Notes

References

External links 
 

1866 births
1923 deaths
Date of death missing
American economists
Harvard College alumni
University of Chicago faculty
American male non-fiction writers